BSON is a computer data interchange format.  The name "BSON" is based on the term JSON and stands for "Binary JSON". It is a binary form for representing simple or complex data structures including associative arrays (also known as name-value pairs), integer indexed arrays, and a suite of fundamental scalar types.
BSON originated in 2009 at MongoDB.  Several scalar data types are of specific interest to MongoDB and the format is used both as a data storage and network transfer format for the MongoDB database, but it can be used independently outside of MongoDB.
Implementations are available in a variety of languages such as C, C++, C#, D, Delphi, Erlang, Go, Haskell, Java, JavaScript, Julia, Lua, OCaml, Perl, PHP, Python, Ruby, Rust, Scala, Smalltalk, and Swift.

Data types and syntax
BSON has a published specification.  The topmost element in the structure must be of type BSON object and 
contains 1 or more elements, where an element consists of a field name, a type, and a value.  Field names are strings.  Types include:

 Unicode string (using the UTF-8 encoding)
 32 bit integer
 64 bit integer
 double (64-bit IEEE 754 floating point number)
 decimal128 (128-bit IEEE 754-2008 floating point number; Binary Integer Decimal (BID) variant), suitable as a carrier for decimal-place sensitive financial data and arbitrary precision numerics with 34 decimal digits of precision, a max value of approximately 106145
 datetime w/o time zone (long integer number of milliseconds since the Unix epoch)
 byte array (for arbitrary binary data)
 boolean (true and false)
 null
 BSON object
 BSON array
 JavaScript code
 MD5 binary data
 Regular expression (Perl compatible regular expressions ("PCRE") version 8.41 with UTF-8 support)

An important differentiator to JSON is that BSON contains types not present in JSON (e.g. datetime and byte array) and offers type-strict handling for several numeric types instead of a universal "number" type. For situations where these additional types need to be represented in a textual way, MongoDB's Extended JSON format can be used.

Efficiency
Compared to JSON, BSON is designed to be efficient both in storage space and scan-speed.  Large elements in a BSON document are prefixed with a length field to facilitate scanning. In some cases, BSON will use more space than JSON due to the length prefixes and explicit array indices.

Example  
A document such as  will be stored as: 

\x16\x00\x00\x00          // total document size
\x02                      // 0x02 = type String
hello\x00                 // field name
\x06\x00\x00\x00world\x00 // field value (size of value, value, null terminator)
\x00                      // 0x00 = type EOO ('end of object')

See also 
 Comparison of data serialization formats
 JSON
 CBOR
 Smile (binary JSON)
 UBJSON
 Protocol Buffers
 Action Message Format
 Apache Thrift
 MessagePack
 Document-oriented database
 MongoDB
 Abstract Syntax Notation One (ASN.1)
 Wireless Binary XML (WBXML)
 Efficient XML Interchange

References

External links 
 
  tool included with MongoDB

JSON
Data serialization formats
Document-oriented databases